Bjärnum is a locality situated in Hässleholm Municipality, Scania County, Sweden with 2,674 inhabitants in 2010.

References

External links
Bjärnum in Sweden

Populated places in Hässleholm Municipality
Populated places in Skåne County